Selections from Going My Way is a studio album of phonograph records by Bing Crosby released in late 1945 featuring songs that were presented in the American musical comedy-drama film Going My Way. This was the first release of one of Crosby's best songs throughout his career, "Swinging on a Star", on shellac disc record.

Chart performance
The album reached the top of the Billboard Best-Selling Popular Record Albums chart in October 1945.

Track listing
These newly issued songs were featured on a 3-disc, 78 rpm album set, Decca Album No. A-405.

*featuring a young Andy Williams

Other releases
Decca released a dual 10” LP of Going My Way and The Bells of St. Mary's on Decca DL 5052 in 1949.

References

Bing Crosby albums
1945 albums
Decca Records albums